The 2020–21 season was the 48th season in the existence of A.S. Cittadella and the club's second consecutive season in the second division of Italian football. In addition to the domestic league, Cittadella participated in this season's edition of the Coppa Italia.

Players

First-team squad

Out on loan

Other players under contract

Transfers

In

Out

Pre-season and friendlies

Competitions

Overall record

Serie B

League table

Results summary

Results by round

Matches
The league fixtures were announced on 9 September 2020.

Promotion play-offs

Coppa Italia

References

A.S. Cittadella
Cittadella